Grand Theatre, Grand Theater, Grand Théâtre (French),  may refer to:

Theatres and cinemas

Canada

The Grand Theatre (Kingston, Ontario)
 The Grand Theatre (London, Ontario)
 Grand Théâtre de Québec

United Kingdom
Grand Theatre, Blackpool
Grand Theatre, Clapham
Grand Theatre, Derby, operated between 1886 and 1950
Grand Theatre, Leeds
Grand Theatre, Lancaster
Grand Theatre, Swansea
Grand Theatre, Wolverhampton

United States
 The Grand Theatre, a chain of 14 multiplex cinemas in the southern United States operated by Southern Theatres

 Grand Theatre (Douglas, Arizona), aka Douglas Grand Theatre, listed on the National Register of Historic Places (NRHP)
 Warner Grand Theatre, San Pedro, California
 Masonic Hall and Grand Theater, Wilmington, Delaware, listed on the NRHP
Grand Theatre (Cartersville, Georgia), designed by Daniell & Beutell
 Loew's Grand Theatre, Atlanta, Georgia
 Grand Theatre (Wheaton, Illinois), a historic theater
 Brown Grand Theatre, Concordia, Kansas
 Grand Theatre (Thibodaux, Louisiana)
 Grand Theater in Crookston, Minnesota, the oldest continuously operating movie theater in the United States
 Grand Theatre (Manhattan), demolished theater on Grand Street, Manhattan, New York City
 Grand Theater in Bismarck, North Dakota, screens are covered by curtains which open for the previews and feature.
 Grand Theater (Salem, Oregon)
 Grand Theater (Wausau, Wisconsin), built on the site of the former Grand Opera House

Elsewhere
Sorted by country
 Grand Theatre, Adelaide, Australia, former cinema
 Grand Theatre, Perth, Australia, a former cinema and theatre
 Chang'an Grand Theatre, Beijing, China
 National Centre for the Performing Arts (China), formerly National Grand Theater, Beijing, China
 Shanghai Grand Theatre, China
 Grand Theatre (Copenhagen), Denmark
 Grand Théâtre de Bordeaux, France
 Grand Senen Theater, Jakarta, Indonesia
 Konpira Grand Theatre, Kotohira, Kagawa, Japan
 Takarazuka Grand Theater, Takarazuka, Hyogo, Japan
 Grand Theatre, Lebanon, located in Beirut
 Grand Theatre, Łódź, Poland
 Grand Theatre, Warsaw, Poland
 Grand Théâtre de Genève, Geneva, Switzerland
 Lviv Theatre of Opera and Ballet, Ukraine
 Odessa Theatre of Opera and Ballet, Ukraine

Other uses
 The Grand Theatre, Volume One, an album by alt-country band Old 97's
 The Grand Theatre, Volume Two, an album by Old 97s

See also
The Grand (disambiguation)